ASIT may refer to:
 ASiT - Association of Surgeons in Training
 Allergen-specific immunotherapy
 Aşıt River